In mathematical physics, a lattice model is a mathematical model of a physical system that is defined on a lattice, as opposed to a continuum, such as the continuum of space or spacetime. Lattice models originally occurred in the context of condensed matter physics, where the atoms of a crystal automatically form a lattice. Currently, lattice models are quite popular in theoretical physics, for many reasons. Some models are exactly solvable, and thus offer insight into physics beyond what can be learned from perturbation theory. Lattice models are also ideal for study by the methods of computational physics, as the discretization of any continuum model automatically turns it into a lattice model. The exact solution to many of these models (when they are solvable) includes the presence of solitons. Techniques for solving these include the inverse scattering transform and the method of Lax pairs, the Yang–Baxter equation and quantum groups. The solution of these models has given insights into the nature of phase transitions, magnetization and scaling behaviour, as well as insights into the nature of quantum field theory. Physical lattice models frequently occur as an approximation to a continuum theory, either to give an ultraviolet cutoff to the theory to prevent divergences or to perform numerical computations. An example of a continuum theory that is widely studied by lattice models is the QCD lattice model, a discretization of quantum chromodynamics. However, digital physics considers nature fundamentally discrete at the Planck scale, which imposes upper limit to the density of information, aka Holographic principle. More generally, lattice gauge theory and lattice field theory are areas of study. Lattice models are also used to simulate the structure and dynamics of polymers.

Mathematical description
A number of lattice models can be described by the following data:
<li> A lattice , often taken to be a lattice in -dimensional Euclidean space  or the -dimensional torus if the lattice is periodic. Concretely,  is often the cubic lattice. If two points on the lattice are considered 'nearest neighbours', then they can be connected by an edge, turning the lattice into a lattice graph.
<li> A spin-variable space . The configuration space  of possible system states is then the space of functions . For some models, we might instead consider instead the space of functions  where  is the edge set of the graph defined above.
<li> An energy functional , which might depend on a set of additional parameters or 'coupling constants' .

Examples
The energy functional is 

The spin-variable space can often be described as a coset. For example, for the Potts model we have . In the limit , we obtain the XY model which has . Generalising the XY model to higher dimensions gives the -vector model which has .

Solvable models
We specialise to a lattice with a finite number of points, and a finite spin-variable space. This can be achieved by making the lattice periodic, with period  in  dimensions. Then the configuration space  is also finite. We can define the partition function

and there are no issues of convergence (like those which emerge in field theory) since the sum is finite. In practice, this is often difficult due to non-linear interactions between sites. Models with a closed-form expression for the partition function are known as exactly solvable.

Examples of exactly solvable models are the periodic 1D Ising model, and the periodic 2D Ising model with vanishing external magnetic field,  but for dimension , the Ising model remains unsolved.

Mean field theory
Due to the difficulty of deriving exact solutions, in order to obtain analytic results we often must resort to mean field theory. This mean field may be spatially varying, or global.

Global mean field
This arises as in going to the mean value of the field, we have . 

By making a suitable approximation, the energy functional becomes a function of the mean field, that is,  The partition function then becomes

where  is the argument minimising .

A simpler, but less mathematically rigorous approach which nevertheless sometimes gives correct results comes from linearising the theory about the mean field .

Such an approach to the periodic Ising model in  dimensions provides insight into phase transitions.

Spatially varying mean field
This gives a spatially varying mean field . This allows the partition function to be written as a path integral

where the free energy  is a Wick rotated version of the action in quantum field theory.

Examples

Condensed matter physics
<li>Ising model
<li>Potts model
<li>Chiral Potts model
<li>XY model
<li>Classical Heisenberg model
<li>n-vector model
<li>Vertex model
<li>Toda lattice

Polymer physics
<li>Bond fluctuation model
<li>2nd model

High energy physics
<li>QCD lattice model

See also
 Crystal structure
 Scaling limit
 QCD matter
 Lattice gas

References

 
Theoretical physics